Crystal skull refers to a number of human-like skull carvings made of quartz crystal and their associated myth and research.

Crystal skull may also refer to:

 The Crystal Skull (video game), a 1996 adventure game
 Crystal Skull (Stargate SG-1), an episode of the TV show Stargate SG-1
 "Crystal Skull", a single by Mastodon from the album Blood Mountain

See also
 Skull (disambiguation)